Deformation monitoring (also referred to as deformation survey) is the systematic measurement and tracking of the alteration in the shape or dimensions of an object as a result of stresses induced by applied loads. Deformation monitoring is a major component of logging measured values that may be used for further computation, deformation analysis, predictive maintenance and alarming.

Deformation monitoring is primarily related to the field of applied surveying, but may also be related to civil engineering, mechanical engineering, construction, and geology. The measuring devices used for deformation monitoring depend on the application, the chosen method, and the preferred measurement interval.

Measuring devices 

Measuring devices (or sensors) can be sorted in two main groups: geodetic and geotechnical sensors. Both measuring devices can be seamlessly combined in modern deformation monitoring. 
Geodetic measuring devices measure georeferenced (relative to established locations outside the monitoring area) displacements or movements in one, two or three dimensions. It includes the use of instruments such as total stations, levels, InSAR, and global navigation satellite system receivers.
Geotechnical measuring devices measure displacements or movements and related environmental effects or conditions without external georeferencing. It includes the use of instruments such as extensometers, piezometers, pressuremeters, rain gauges, thermometers, barometers, tiltmeters, accelerometers, seismometers, etc.

Application 
Deformation monitoring can be required for the following applications:
Dams
Roads
Tunnels
Bridges and Viaducts
High-rise and historical buildings
Foundations
Construction sites
Mining
Landslide areas
Volcanoes
Settlement areas
Earthquake areas

Methods 

Deformation monitoring can be manual or automatic. Manual deformation monitoring is the operation of sensors or instruments by hand or manual downloading of collected data from deformation monitoring instruments. Automatic deformation monitoring operation of a group of software and hardware elements for deformation monitoring that, once set up, does not require human input to function.

Note that deformation analysis and interpretation of the data collected by the monitoring system is not included in this definition.

Automated deformation monitoring requires instruments to communicate with a base station. Communication methods used include:
Transmission cable (RS-232, RS-485, fiber optics)
Local area network (LAN) 
Wireless LAN (WLAN) 
Mobile communication (GSM, GPRS, UMTS)
WiMax

Regularity and scheduling 

The monitoring regularity and time interval of the measurements must be considered depending on the application and object to be monitored. Objects can undergo both rapid, high frequency movement and slow, gradual movement. For example, a bridge might oscillates with a period of a few seconds due to the influence of traffic and wind and also be shifting gradually due to tectonic changes.

Regularity: ranges from a days, weeks or years for manual monitoring and continuous for automatic monitoring systems.
Measurement interval: ranges from fractions of a second to hours.

Deformation analysis 
Deformation analysis is concerned with determining if a measured displacement is significant enough to warrant a response. Deformation data must be checked for statistical significance, and then checked against specified limits, and reviewed to see if movements below specified limits imply potential risks.

The software acquires data from sensors, computes meaningful values from the measurements, records results, and can notify responsible persons should threshold value be exceeded. However, a human operator must make considered decisions on the appropriate response to the movement, e.g. independent verification though on-site inspections, re-active controls such as structural repairs and emergency responses such as shut down processes, containment processes and site evacuation.

See also 
 Engineering Geology
 Slope stability
 Slope stability radar
 Structural health monitoring

References 

 Literature, B. Glisic and D. Inaudi (2008). Fibre Optic Methods for Structural Health Monitoring. Wiley. 
 Literature, John Dunnicliff (1988,1993). Geotechnical Instrumentation For Monitoring Field Performance. Wiley.

Further reading 

 American Surveyor, Elevated Monitoring (page 6-12)
 
 North Americas Largest Copper Mine, Automated Mine Monitoring Integrated System
 The use of Slope Stability Radar (SSR) in managing Slope Instability Hazards, AusIMM Bulletin, January/February 2008
 Applications and Limitations of Automated Motorized Total Stations by Douglas S. Roy, P.E., M.ASCE and Pierre Gouvin, A.M.ASCE
 The American Surveyor (Oct 2007) - 24/7 Structural Monitoring
 Monitoring of Open Pit Mines using Combined GNSS Satellite Receivers and Robotic Total Stations
 Engineering Solutions with Trimble 4D Control, Trimble Survey Controller, Trimble S8 Total Station White Paper, Trimble 2007
 Advances in RTK and Post Processed Monitoring with Single Frequency GPS
 Nachweis von Turmbewegungen mit einem Multisensorsystem
 Monitoring Hong Kong's Bridges Real-Time Kinematic Spans The Gap
 FIG 2001 - Modern Monitoring System Software Development

In situ geotechnical investigations
Deformation (mechanics)